Shahidlu (also Romanized as Shahīdlū; also known as Seyyedlar and Seyyedlū) is a village in Qaflankuh-e Gharbi Rural District, in the Central District of Meyaneh County, East Azerbaijan Province, Iran. At the 2006 census, its population was 9, in 5 families.

References 

Populated places in Meyaneh County